Semyon Ivanovich Marushkin (24 July 1919 – 4 September 1993) was a welterweight Greco-Roman wrestler from Russia who competed at the 1952 Summer Olympics. He won his first three bouts, but then lost to the eventual silver medalist Gösta Andersson and ended in a fourth place. Domestically he won the Soviet title in Greco-Roman (1950 and 1951) and freestyle wrestling (1947).

Marushkin fought in World War II, and after retiring from competitions had a long career as a wrestling coach and referee.

References

External links
 

1919 births
1993 deaths
Soviet male sport wrestlers
Olympic wrestlers of the Soviet Union
Wrestlers at the 1952 Summer Olympics